Hüttenbach is a river of Bavaria, Germany. It is a 255 m long, left tributary of the Altmühl at Obereichstätt. Its source is a karst spring.

See also
List of rivers of Bavaria

Rivers of Bavaria
Rivers of Germany